Nagaland Lok Sabha constituency is the only Lok Sabha (lower house of the Indian parliament) in the Northeastern state of Nagaland.

It participated in its first general election in 1967 and its first member of parliament (MP) was S. C. Jamir of the Nagaland Nationalist Organisation who was elected unopposed. In 1969, the Twenty-third Amendment of the Constitution of India discontinued the reservation of the seat to Scheduled Tribes. In the 1971 election, Kevichüsa Angami of the United Front of Nagaland party defeated Jamir. Rano M. Shaiza of the United Democratic Front was elected in the 1977 election. In the 1980 election, independent candidate, Chingwang was elected. Chingwang joined the Indian National Congress (INC) for the next election in 1984 and held his seat. Shikino Sam of the INC won the 1989 election. From 1991–98, Imchalemba was the MP of this constituency firstly as a member of the Nagaland Peoples Council and then as a member of the INC. From 1998–2004, K. Asungba Sangtam of the INC represented this constituency. Since 2004, this constituency has been represented by a member of the Nagaland Peoples Front. W. Wangyuh Konyak was the MP from 2004–09. C. M. Chang won the seat in 2009.

Assembly Segments
Currently, this Lok Sabha constituency consists of all the 60 constituencies of Nagaland Legislative Assembly.

Members of Parliament

Election results

General election 1967
In its first election, Nagaland Nationalist Organisation candidate, S. C. Jamir was elected unopposed and represented the constituency in the 4th Lok Sabha.

General election 1971
A. Kevichusa of the United Front of Nagaland won the election and represented the constituency in the 5th Lok Sabha.

General election 1977
Rano M. Shaiza of the United Democratic Front party won the seat and represented the constituency in the 6th Lok Sabha.

General election 1980
Independent candidate, Chingwang won the election and represented the constituency in the 7th Lok Sabha.

General election 1984
Chingwang joined the INC, held the seat and represented the constituency in the 8th Lok Sabha.

General election 1989
Shikino Sam of the INC represented the constituency in the 9th Lok Sabha.

General election 1991
The election was a direct contest between sitting MP Shikiho Sema from the INC and Imchalemba of the NPC. This was the first election that the BJP fielded a candidate for the Nagaland seat, Pius Lotha, who had to repeatedly reiterate that the BJP was not a communal party. The ban on the National Socialist Council of Nagaland by the Vishwanath Pratap Singh government was the main issue during the election campaigning with the INC and NPC blaming each other for the ban.

General election 1996
On 28 July 1992, Imchalemba had joined the Congress. He fought the 1996 elections on the Congress' ticket. The continued presence of the security forces in Nagaland was an important electoral issue. The Naga Students' Federation demanded a boycott of the elections until the "disturbed area" tagged under the Armed Forces (Special Powers) Act was revoked. Congress now had their government in the Centre as well as the state. Imchalemba's opponent, H. Khekiho Zhimomi stated "we certainly don't deserve these black laws in the state and we have the experience of the '50s and '60s which have made this crystal clear. As long as we have these laws operational in the state, violence and tension will continue during elections." Imchalemba won the election comfortably and represented the state in the 11th Lok Sabha.

General election 1998
K. Asungba Sangtam of the INC represented the constituency in the 12th Lok Sabha.

General election 1999
Sangtam of the INC held the seat and represented the constituency in the 13th Lok Sabha.

General election 2004
W. Wangyuh Konyak of the Nagaland Peoples Front represented the constituency in the 14th Lok Sabha.

General election 2009
C. M. Chang of the Nagaland Peoples Front represented the constituency in the 15th Lok Sabha.

General election 2014
Neiphiu Rio of the Nagaland Peoples Front represented the constituency in the 16th Lok Sabha.

Bye-Election 2018

General Elections 2019

General Elections 2024

See also
List of Constituencies of the Lok Sabha

References
 Nagaland Lok Sabha Election 2019 Results Website

External links
Nagaland lok sabha  constituency election 2019 date and schedule

Constituencies of the Lok Sabha
Indian general elections in Nagaland
Lok Sabha